Edward Edgar Holley (July 23, 1899 – October 26, 1986) was a professional baseball pitcher. He played four seasons in Major League Baseball with the Chicago Cubs in 1928 and the Philadelphia Phillies and Pittsburgh Pirates 1932-34, in the National League.

External links 

Major League Baseball pitchers
Chicago Cubs players
Philadelphia Phillies players
Pittsburgh Pirates players
Madisonville Miners players
Louisville Colonels (minor league) players
Kansas City Blues (baseball) players
Buffalo Bisons (minor league) players
Baseball players from Kentucky
1899 births
1986 deaths
People from Benton, Kentucky